The Software Testing Automation Framework (STAF) is an open source Eclipse Public License (EPL) project that enables users to create cross-platform, distributed software test environments. It's designed around the idea of reusable components, called services (such as process invocation, resource management, logging, and monitoring). STAF relieves the user of building an automation infrastructure, and lets them focus on building the automation solution instead. The STAF framework provides the foundation upon which to build higher level solutions, and provides a pluggable approach supported across a variety of platforms and languages.

Services 
STAF includes a number of services that provide specific functionality. The most prominent of these is called the STAf eXecution engine (STAX), which executes test scripts. Other services provide cron, file system, inter-process communication, e-mail, and HTML support, among others. The documentation also includes instructions and guidelines for developers to generate their own custom services.

Support 
IBM supports users of STAF through extensive online documentation and user forums, accessible via the STAF website.

External links
 Software Testing Automation Framework (STAF)

Free software testing tools
IBM software